Campiglossa producta is a species of tephritid or fruit flies in the genus Campiglossa of the family Tephritidae.

Distribution
The species is found in the United Kingdom, Finland, South to Turkey, Central Asia.

References

Tephritinae
Insects described in 1844
Diptera of Europe
Diptera of Asia
Taxa named by Hermann Loew